René Antonius Maria Eijkelkamp (born 6 April 1964) is a Dutch football coach and former player who played as a Forward He has been assistant coach at PSV and the Netherlands national team.

Club career
Born in Dalfsen, Eijkelkamp started his professional career in the 1981–82 season at Go Ahead Eagles in Deventer, where he stayed for five seasons.

The tall striker then moved to FC Groningen (1986–1990), KV Mechelen (1990–1993), Club Brugge (1993–1995) and PSV Eindhoven (1995–1997). His last two seasons he played in Germany, for Schalke 04.

International career
Eijkelkamp made his debut for the Netherlands national team in a November 1988 friendly match against Italy and earned a total of six caps, scoring no goals. His final international was a September 1995 UEFA Euro Championship qualification match against Belarus.

Managerial career
Eijkelkamp has also obtained his coaching license at CIOS Friesland College Heerenveen in 2000. He has worked as an assistant manager at Go Ahead Eagles, FC Twente, PSV and the Oranje.

Honours
Club Brugge
Belgian Cup: 1994–95

PSV
Eredivisie: 1996–97
KNVB Cup: 1995–96
Johan Cruyff Shield: 1996

References

External links
 
 René Eijkelkamp at beijen.net 
 

1964 births
Living people
People from Dalfsen
Footballers from Overijssel
Dutch footballers
Association football forwards
Netherlands international footballers
Go Ahead Eagles players
FC Groningen players
K.V. Mechelen players
Club Brugge KV players
PSV Eindhoven players
FC Schalke 04 players
Eredivisie players
Belgian Pro League players
Bundesliga players
Dutch football managers
FC Twente non-playing staff
Dutch expatriate footballers
Expatriate footballers in Belgium
Dutch expatriate sportspeople in Belgium
Expatriate footballers in Germany
Dutch expatriate sportspeople in Germany
Association football coaches
Go Ahead Eagles non-playing staff
FC Schalke 04 non-playing staff
PSV Eindhoven non-playing staff
SBV Vitesse non-playing staff